Lorenzo Dow Thompson (November 22, 1873 – October 1, 1951) was an American politician. He served as the State Treasurer of Missouri from 1921 to 1925.

References

State treasurers of Missouri
Missouri Republicans
1873 births
1951 deaths